Daniel  is a part of Pośrednik village in the administrative district of Gmina Szczytniki, within Kalisz County, Greater Poland Voivodeship, in west-central Poland.

The part of the Pośrednik village has a population of 40 (in year 2006).

References

Daniel